The sphenofrontal suture is the cranial suture between the sphenoid bone and the frontal bone.

Additional images

References

External links
 
 

Bones of the head and neck
Cranial sutures
Human head and neck
Joints
Joints of the head and neck
Skeletal system
Skull